Cape Town City Football Club is a South African professional football club based in Cape Town, South Africa, that plays in the Premier Soccer League (PSL). The original football club Cape Town City FC was founded in 1962, before being reformed in 2016. The team plays its home matches at the Cape Town Stadium, and its training centre is based at Hartleyvale Stadium, the club's original home ground between 1962–77.

History
Cape Town City was resurrected when South African businessman and former professional soccer player John Comitis purchased the franchise rights of defunct Mpumalanga Black Aces F.C. Comitis was one of two co-founders of Ajax Cape Town F.C. in 1999 but eventually sold his shares in 2013. In 2016, Comitis bought defunct Black Aces, located in Nelspruit, Mpumalanga, and relocated the team with the franchise license in Cape Town.

Stadium
Cape Town City play their home matches at Cape Town Stadium in the suburb of Green Point in Cape Town. In 2018, the club announced that they would begin using Hartleyvale Stadium as a training facility but continue home matches at Cape Town Stadium.

Rivalries 
Cape Town is a city with many football clubs and so there are many smaller derbies. However the fixtures against the second largest club in the city, Cape Town Spurs FC (formerly Ajax Cape Town FC) are the biggest derby games. Fellow DStv Premiership team Stellenbosch FC (formerly Vasco de Gama FC) are also considered close rivals.

There is also a rivalry against Supersport United after the Telkom Knockout final in 2016 and the MTN 8 finals of 2017 and 2018 all being contested by the two clubs.

Honours
Cape Town City won the 2016 Telkom Knockout Cup, defeating Supersport United 2–1 in the final on 10 December 2016. City scored 12 goals in four games during the tournament to win in 2016–17 Cape Town City F.C. season.

 Telkom Knockout
 Winners: 2016
 MTN 8 
 Winners: 2018
 Runners up: 2017, 2021

Club technical team

First-team squad

Legends
Cape Town City offers lifetime awards to a distinguished group of 30 Cape Town football "Legends". Notable players such as Thabo Mngomeni, David Nyathi, Ben Anderson, Bernard Hartze, Reggie Jantjiesm Farouk Abrahams, Theko Modise, Craig Martin, Edmilson Dove and Lebogang Manyama feature as honourees on this list. This also includes the long-serving captain, Thamsanqa Mkhize.

The club's first and current manager, Eric Tinkler achieved early success. The club also has been managed by ex-South African footballer Benni McCarthy.

References

External links 

 
Association football clubs established in 2016
Premier Soccer League clubs
Soccer clubs in Cape Town
2016 establishments in South Africa